For Her Boy's Sake is a 1913 American silent short romantic drama directed by starring William Garwood, Victory Bateman, James Cruze, William Russell and Marguerite Snow.

External links

1913 romantic drama films
1913 films
American romantic drama films
American silent short films
American black-and-white films
1913 short films
1910s American films
Silent romantic drama films
Silent American drama films